Andrei Yurynok (born 21 September 1996) is a Belarusian handball player for HC Meshkov Brest and the Belarusian national team.

He competed at the 2016 European Men's Handball Championship.

References

External links

1996 births
Living people
Belarusian male handball players
Sportspeople from Brest, Belarus